Ellie Jade Brazil (born 10 January 1999) is an English footballer who plays as a forward for Tottenham Hotspur. She joined Birmingham City at the age of 16 and has represented England at under-15 to under-23 level.

Club career 
Before signing for Birmingham, Brazil played for the Derby County academy and was a gold medal winner in the 800 metres at the 2015 English Schools' Athletics Championships.

Fiorentina

In August 2017 Ellie signed for Fiorentina Women's FC of Serie A, despite the offer of "an exciting fresh deal" from Birmingham City. She scored her first goal for the team on 28 October 2017 against Sassuolo in the third match of the season.

Brighton & Hove Albion

On 13 July 2018 former England manager Hope Powell signed Brazil for Brighton stating: "Ellie has already gained valuable experience playing in both England and Italy's top division."  She made her debut on the opening day of the season in the match against Bristol City, and scored her first goal in a 3–1 League Cup win over London Bees. She scored her first two league goals for the club in the 75th and 78th minutes of a 3–3 draw against Everton, to help Brighton secure their first point of the season.

In November 2019 Brazil suffered an anterior cruciate ligament injury, which ruled her out for at least the rest of the 2019–20 FA WSL season. She returned to the matchday squad on 18 October 2020 for the game against Everton and returned to the field for the last 31 minutes of the game against Tottenham on 6 December the same year. A week later she played the full 90 minutes against Chelsea.

Tottenham Hotspur 
On 6 July 2022 it was announced that Brazil had signed a two-year deal to sign for Tottenham Hotspur. She made her competitive debut for the side as a 16th minute substitute during a 2–1 win against Leicester City on 18 September 2022. She made her first start on 22 October against  Manchester City but picked up a second ACL injury that ruled her out for the rest of the season.

International career 
On 8 January 2019 Brazil was called up to Mo Marley's Under 21 national team training camp. She made her debut for the side on 5 April 2019 during a 1–1 draw with France.

Career statistics

Club

Honours

Club
Birmingham City
FA Women's Cup runner-up: 2016–17

International
UEFA Women's Under-17 Championship third place: 2016

Personal life 
Her father is former league footballer and manager Gary Brazil.

References

External links
 
 
 England player profile

Living people
1999 births
English women's footballers
Women's association football forwards
Women's Super League players
Birmingham City W.F.C. players
Fiorentina Women's F.C. players
English expatriate women's footballers
English expatriate sportspeople in Italy
Serie A (women's football) players
Expatriate women's footballers in Italy
People from West Bridgford
Footballers from Nottinghamshire
Brighton & Hove Albion W.F.C. players